Warfstermolen (Low Saxon: Warfstermeul) is a village in Noardeast-Fryslân municipality, in the province of Friesland, the Netherlands. It had a population of 203 in January 2017. Before 2019, the village was part of the Kollumerland en Nieuwkruisland municipality.

History 
The village was first mentioned in 1574 "wyntmolen staende op de dyk by de Warff", and means "windmill near the settlement on the dike". The dike was built around 1315, and Warfstermolen is a linear settlement along the dike. In 1840, Warfstermolen was home to 115 people.

Gallery

References

External links

Noardeast-Fryslân
Populated places in Friesland